Loriotus is a genus of birds in the tanager family Thraupidae. The species now placed in this genus were formerly placed in the genus Tachyphonus.

Taxonomy and species list
The three species now assigned to Loriotus were traditionally placed in the genus Tachyphonus. A molecular phylogenetic study published in 2014 found that Tachyphonus was polyphyletic. In the subsequent reorganization the genus Loriotus was resurrected for these three species. The genus had been introduced in 1821 by the Polish zoologist Feliks Paweł Jarocki with the flame-crested tanager as the type species. The name is derived from the French word loriot that is used for the Old World orioles.

The three species in the genus are:

References

 
Bird genera
Taxa named by Feliks Paweł Jarocki